Hickory Daily Record is  an American, English language daily newspaper based in Hickory, North Carolina, USA. It is owned by Lee Enterprises and is published seven days a week.  The newspaper is a member of the North Carolina Press Association.

The newspaper serves the city of Hickory along with Catawba County and Burke, as well as the neighboring Alexander  and Caldwell counties.

In 2019, the circulation was 9,372 (weekend) and 7,853 (daily).

See also
 List of newspapers in North Carolina

References

External links
 
 

1915 establishments in North Carolina
Daily newspapers published in North Carolina
Hickory, North Carolina
Lee Enterprises publications
Publications established in 1915